Thomas Humphries may refer to:

Tom Humphries, Irish sports journalist 
Tom L. Humphries, American university professor

See also
Thomas Humphreys (disambiguation)